Henry H. Schwartz (1869–1955) was a U.S. Senator from Wyoming from 1937 to 1943. Senator Schwartz may also refer to:

A. R. Schwartz (1926–2018), Texas State Senate
Allyson Schwartz (born 1948), Pennsylvania State Senate
Gail Schwartz (1990s–2010s), Colorado State Senate
Murray Schwartz (Queens politician) (1919–2001), New York State Senate

See also
Joe Schwarz (born 1937), Michigan State Senate